Raul Cravid is a São Toméan politician. He previously served as Minister of Planning and Finance.

References

Year of birth missing (living people)
Living people
Government ministers of São Tomé and Príncipe
Place of birth missing (living people)
21st-century São Tomé and Príncipe politicians